Trebor Worthen (born January 27, 1980) is an American politician who served in the Oklahoma House of Representatives from the 87th district from 2004 to 2008.

References

1980 births
Living people
Republican Party members of the Oklahoma House of Representatives